Kim Ju-Bong (born April 7, 1986) is a South Korean football player who, as of 2011 is playing for Korea National League side Mokpo City FC. His previous clubs are Gangwon FC and Daejeon Hydro & Nuclear Power FC.

On November 18, 2008, he was one of sixteen priority members to join Gangwon FC. He made his debut for Gangwon against Daegu FC by substitute on April 8, 2009 in league cup match. From 2010 season, he joined Korea National League side Daejeon Hydro & Nuclear Power FC.

Club career statistics

References

External links
 K-League Player Record 

1986 births
Living people
South Korean footballers
Gangwon FC players
K League 1 players
Korea National League players
Association football midfielders